The S12 district lies within in the City of Sheffield, South Yorkshire, England.  The district contains 13 listed buildings that are recorded in the National Heritage List for England.  All the listed buildings are designated at Grade II, the lowest of the three grades, which is applied to "buildings of national importance and special interest".  The district is in the south east of the city of Sheffield, and covers the areas of Birley, Charnock, Gleadless, Gleadless Townend, Frecheville, Hackenthorpe and Intake.  The listed buildings consist of 

For neighbouring areas, see listed buildings in S2, listed buildings in S8, listed buildings in S13, listed buildings in S14, listed buildings in S20 and listed buildings in Eckington, Derbyshire.



Buildings

References 

 - A list of all the listed buildings within Sheffield City Council's boundary is available to download from this page.

Sources

 S12
Sheffield S12